Seyyed Mohammad Saeedi (Persian: سید محمد سعیدی; born 1951, Qom) is an Iranian Twelver Shia cleric, who is the trustee of the Fatima Masumeh Shrine, and Qom Imam of Friday Prayer. He is also the representative of Guardianship of the Islamic Jurist of Qom.

Family 
Seyyed Mohammad Reza Saeedi was Seyyed Mohammad's father; and his mother is from the family (descendants) of Mirza Shirazi. He is also the brother-in-law of Seyyed Ahmad Khatami, the (temporary) Imam of Friday Prayer --of Tehran.

Education 
(Seyyed) Mohammad Saeedi who was born in Qom, passed his elementary education in his city, and studied for high-school in the city of Tehran. Considering his father's testament, Seyyed Mohammad (and his brothers) entered the Hawzah (seminary). He passed his Hawzah education in Mashhad, and got married in that city. Later on, he moved to Qom to continue his seminary education, and likewise he taught there as a teacher. Seyyed Mohammad had several teachers, amongst: Mirza Hashem Amoli, Fazel Lankarani, Jawad Tabrizi, etc.

See also 

 Seyyed Mohammad Reza Saeedi
 Fatima Masumeh Shrine
 Ali Akbar Masoudi Khomeini

References 

People from Mashhad
Iranian ayatollahs
People from Qom
Representatives of the Supreme Leader in the Provinces of Iran
1951 births
Living people